Josep Lluís Sert i López (1 July 190215 March 1983) was a Catalan, Spain  architect and city planner.

Biography 
Born in Barcelona, Catalonia, Sert showed keen interest in the works of his uncle, the painter Josep Maria Sert, and of Antoni Gaudí. He studied architecture at the Escola Superior d'Arquitectura in Barcelona and set up his own studio in 1929. That same year Sert moved to Paris, in response to an invitation from Le Corbusier to work for him (without payment). Returning to Barcelona in 1930, he continued his practice there until 1937. During the 1930s, Sert co-founded the group GATCPAC (Grup d'Artistes i Tècnics Catalans per al Progrés de l'Arquitectura Contemporània, i.e. Group of Catalan Artists and Technicians for the Progress of Contemporary Architecture), which later became, with the addition of the western and north groups, the GATEPAC (Grupo de Artistas y Técnicos Españoles para el Progreso de l'Arquitectura Contemporánea), which was in turn the Spanish branch of the Congrès International d'Architecture Moderne (CIAM). Sometime later, Sert became President of CIAM (1947–1956). He created several outstanding pieces of modern architecture during this period, such as the week-end house in El Garraf, Catalonia, Spain (1935), the Central Dispensary of Barcelona (1935) and the Master Plan for the City of Barcelona (1933–1935). From 1937 through 1939, Sert lived in Paris, where he designed the Spanish Republic's pavilion at the World's Fair, the Paris Exposition of 1937. For the artistic content of the building, Sert called on his Spanish artist friends Pablo Picasso, Joan Miró, and Alexander Calder; Picasso's contribution was Guernica, which became the focal attraction of Sert's design.

Career in the United States 

In 1939, having been disqualified from practising as an architect in Spain, Sert went into exile in New York City where he worked with the Town Planning Associates, carrying out numerous urban plans for cities in South America.

In 1952, Sert held a one-year Visiting Professorship at Yale University. The following year he became Dean of the Harvard Graduate School of Design (1953–1969). There, Sert initiated the world's first degree program in urban design; integrated the programs of architecture, planning, landscape and urban design, and taught many of today's leading architects. During this period, he served on the Advisory Board of the newly created Graham Foundation in Chicago, Illinois.

In 1955, Sert founded a studio in Cambridge, Massachusetts which in 1958 became a partnership with Huson Jackson and Ronald Gourley. Joseph Zalewski was the Associate and continued to be in the firm Sert, Jackson and Associates founded in 1963. The studio designed many well-known projects including the Maeght Foundation (1959–1964) in southern France, the Fundació Miró (museum) in Barcelona (1975) and quite a few buildings for Harvard University, including Holyoke Center (1958–1965), the Harvard Science Center (1969–1972), Peabody Terrace (apartments, 1962–1964), and the Center for the Study of World Religions at the Harvard Divinity School. Among other notable buildings in the vicinity are a complex at Boston University including its law school, student union, and main library (1960–1965), Sert's home in Cambridge, as well as the Martin Luther King elementary school (1968–1971), located across from Peabody Terrace. In New York, he completed the Eastwood and Westview apartments on Roosevelt Island, NYC (1976).

In 1961, Sert brought Le Corbusier to the United States to design the Carpenter Center for the Visual Arts at Harvard, and a gallery in the Carpenter Center is now named in Sert's honor. In 1981, he received the AIA Gold Medal.

The art world 
Josep Lluis Sert counted amongst his close friends the likes of Alexander Calder, Joan Miró, Georges Braque, and Marc Chagall, for whom he designed studios and homes. He brought art into the Harvard curriculum through his commissioning of the Carpenter Center and his subsequent avid support for it. His design for the Fondation Maeght in Saint-Paul-de-Vence, France, the Fundació Joan Miró in Barcelona and the Museum School were more than an architect-client relationship, they were partnerships in the discovery of modern art.

Among Sert's students and colleagues in his studio were leading and past master architects from the United States, Spain, France, Bolivia and Brazil, Venezuela, as well as Dolf Schnebli of Switzerland, Fumihiko Maki of Japan, and Christopher Charles Benninger of India.

Major buildings and projects 
 1930–1931: Apartment Building at 342 Muntaner Street, Barcelona, Catalonia, Spain
 1933–1934: Joieria J. Roca (currently, Boutique Rolex) at 18, Passeig de Gràcia, Barcelona, Catalonia, Spain
 1934: Ciutat de Repòs i de Vacances, project, along the Garraf coast south of Barcelona, Catalonia, Spain
 1933–1935: Dispensari Antituberculós, Barcelona, Catalonia, Spain
 1932–1936: Casa Bloc, apartment building, Barcelona, Catalonia, Spain
 1937: Pavilion of the Spanish Republic, Exposition Internationale des Arts et Techniques dans la Vie Moderne, Paris Rebuilt in 1992 in Barcelona, Catalonia, Spain
 1955: Joan Miró studio (Fundació Pilar i Joan Miró), Palma, Majorca, Spain
 1955-1958: Havana Plan Piloto, Havana Cuba.
 1955–1961: Embassy of the United States, Baghdad, Iraq (abandoned 1990)
 1957: Sert's home at 64 Francis Avenue, Cambridge, Massachusetts
 1958–1960: Center for the Study of World Religions, Harvard Divinity School, Cambridge, Massachusetts
 1958–1965: Holyoke Center (Now) Smith Campus Center, Harvard University, Cambridge, Massachusetts
 1959–1964: Fondation Maeght in Saint-Paul de Vence, France
 1964: The Can Pep Simó Estate in Jesús, Ibiza.
 1969: Hotel at Cala d'en Serra, Ibiza, Spain (abandoned)
 1969: Eastwood and Westview apartment complexes, Roosevelt Island, New York
 1971: Carmel de la Paix in Mazille (Saône-et-Loire), France
 1973: Harvard Science Center, Harvard University, Cambridge, Massachusetts
 1975: Fundació Joan Miró, Barcelona, Catalonia, Spain

Bibliography 
 Mumford, Eric (2015) The Writings of Lluis Sert, 184 pages, Yale University Press, English; 
 Mumford, Eric, and Sarkis, Eric editors (2008) Harvard University Graduate School of Design: Josep Lluis Sert: The Architect of Urban Design 1953–1969; Yale University Press, English; 
 VV.AA., 4 Centenarios: Luis Barragán, Marcel Breuer, Ärne Jacobsen, José Luis Sert, (4 volúmenes), Valladolid, Spain, 2002, Universidad de Valladolid, Página Web 
 Rovira, Josep M. (2000, Spanish); Saavedra, Leonara (2004, English translation): Jose Luis Sert 1901-1983 (Modern Masters) Electra Milano, distributed by Phaidon Press; . 
 Tyrwhitt, J., Sert, J.L., Rogers, E.N., Gropius, W., Neutra, R., Sweeney, J.L., Steinberg, S., et al. editors (1952) CIAM 8: The Heart of the City: Towards the Humanization of Human Life. 185 pages; Lund Humphries; ASIN:B00170PZDO

References

External links 

 Ibizaphoto.blogspot.com: abandoned Josep Lluís Sert hotel complex at Cala d'en Serra, Ibiza

Architects from Catalonia
Urban planners from Catalonia
Modernist architects
1902 births
1983 deaths
Congrès International d'Architecture Moderne members
Exiles of the Spanish Civil War in the United States
Harvard Graduate School of Design faculty
People from Ibiza
20th-century Spanish architects
Honorary Members of the Royal Academy
Recipients of the AIA Gold Medal